Coniatus elegans is a species of true weevils in the subfamily Hyperinae. It is found in Syria.

References

External links 

 
 Coniatus at insectoid.info

Beetles described in 1868
Hyperinae